Highway 65 is a major highway in northern Israel.  It connects Hadera with the Galilee.

This road is the shortest and simplest way to connect these two major regions.  Historically, people traveled on or near this route for thousands of years from the coastal plain to reach the Galilee, and beyond it the Golan, Syria, Lebanon, and Jordan (see Via Maris).  In the 1949 Armistice Agreements Israel received the portion of this road in Wadi Ara for this reason.

The road passes by many Arab villages and cities but few Jewish habitations in Nahal Iron.  In October 2000, at the beginning of the Second Intifada, the road was blocked by local Palestinian protesters.  For security reasons Highway 70, which runs parallel to the north of Highway 65, has been improved.

The northern section of the highway, between Golani and Nahal Amud (nearby Kadarim) is a freeway.

Path of Highway 65 from southwest to northeast
The road begins in the coastal plain near Hadera and Caesarea.  Its western terminus is Highway 2.  After Pardes Hana-Karkur, the road is colloquially known as "Wadi Ara road", passing through Iron Valley and Umm el-Fahm.  Afterward the road intersects Highway 66 at Megiddo junction. From this point to Afula the road crosses the southern part of the Jezreel Valley. This section is widely known as "Kvish HaSargel" (in English: "Ruler Road") as its route is as flat and straight as a ruler.  It then passes by Afula Illit, and turns directly north until crossing Highway 77 at Golani Interchange.  It continues to its northeast terminus at Nahal Amud junction, where it meets Highway 85.

Improvements
The long term plans are for the entire highway to be converted to a freeway, including a new bypass section just north of Afula. Given the extremely high cost of the overall effort required (estimated at nearly NIS 3.5 billion, equivalent to almost US$1 billion), this will be implemented in phases, with work on the Afula–Golani section expected to be implemented first as it is the only section of the road which still consists of only two lanes. Construction on this section is expected to begin by 2019.

See also 
List of highways in Israel

65